Lynsi Lavelle Snyder-Ellingson  (previously Seawell, Martinez, and Torres; born May 5, 1982) is an American billionaire businesswoman, the owner and heiress of the In-N-Out Burger company. She is the only child of Lynda and H. Guy Snyder and the only grandchild of Harry and Esther Snyder, who founded In-N-Out in 1948.

According to the Bloomberg Billionaires Index, in 2012, Snyder was the youngest American female billionaire. As the sole beneficiary of family trusts, she received control of the company's stock in its entirety on her 35th birthday, becoming the sole owner.

Early life

Snyder was born in San Dimas, California, to Lynda Lou (née Wilson) and Harry Guy Snyder. She is of Dutch descent on her father's side. When she was 12, her parents separated and she moved with her mother to the small town of Shingletown, California, where she lived on a ranch. She graduated from Country Christian School, a private high school in Palo Cedro, California. Her parents eventually divorced in January 1997. She has two older half-sisters (Traci and Teri) through her mother. Traci is married to former In-N-Out President and former COO Mark Taylor. Snyder's uncle Rich died in 1993 in a plane crash, and her father died in 1999 of congestive heart failure as a result of his excessive prescription drug use.

Career

On January 1, 2010, Snyder became the 6th President of In-N-Out, succeeding her brother-in-law, Mark Taylor, who was promoted to the Chief Operating Officer of the company. She occupies the same leadership position that her grandfather Harry (1948–1976), uncle Rich (1976–1993), father Guy (1993–1999), and grandmother Esther (1999–2006) previously held. Before Snyder became President of In-N-Out Burger, a taped message from her was broadcast to all company associates letting them know about the transition and the future of the company.  Esther Snyder's signature was finally replaced with Lynsi Snyder's on associates' paychecks in 2009, three years after Esther Snyder's death.

During 2006, Snyder and In-N-Out were embroiled in a bitter lawsuit with a former company executive, Rich Boyd. Boyd was fired for allegedly misusing company funds, but he claimed that Snyder, and then Vice-President Mark Taylor, were trying to oust the elderly Esther Snyder from the company. Both Lynsi Snyder and Mark Taylor denied the claims, with Snyder saying the lawsuit “contains outright lies and awful inaccuracies to try to cover his own errors. By far, the most upsetting is his fabrication about the relationship between me and my gramma.” The lawsuit was settled out of court in May 2006.

Snyder took ownership of her father's share of In-N-Out (50% of the company) on her 30th birthday, and inherited the balance of the company that was not already in trust for her when her grandmother Esther died. Snyder gained full control of the company when she turned 35.

In February 2013, Snyder was ranked a billionaire for the first time by the Bloomberg Billionaires Index, based on an In-N-Out valuation of $1.1 billion. That same year, she ranked No. 93 on Maxim'''s annual Hot 100 list.

Snyder is known for her servant leadership and commitment to maintaining her family’s legacy of delivering “Quality and Service.” Under her leadership, In-N-Out has grown to include more than 380 stores and expanded into Oregon and Colorado, allowing the company to serve customers in seven states. She has also continued the tradition started by her uncle Rich of including Bible verses on In-N-Out packaging, adding Proverbs 24:16 to the French fry containers, Luke 6:35 to the coffee cups and Isaiah 9:6 to the holiday cups.

In 2021, the Orange County Business Journal featured Lynsi in the OC50, the annual listing of the 50 most influential executives in Orange County, and she was named the Los Angeles Business Journal 2021 Women’s Business Leadership Award’s CEO of the Year. Additionally, Snyder is regularly rated as a top female CEO with a 96% approval rating on Glassdoor.com.

Philanthropy

Snyder co-founded Slave 2 Nothing, a non-profit corporation that exists to create, educate and assist in solutions to eliminate human trafficking and help individuals and their families to experience complete freedom and healing from substance addiction, with her husband Sean Ellingson in 2016. The foundation raises money and directs it to organizations that combat both substance abuse and human trafficking. In 2021, it made 96 grants totaling $1.7 million to nonprofit organizations in the seven states where In-N-Out has restaurants.

She is President of the In-N-Out Burger Foundation, which supports abused and neglected children, and was founded by her uncle Rich Snyder, grandmother Esther Snyder and mom Lynda Snyder.

 Ministry 
In 2014, Snyder and her husband Sean Ellingson founded Army of Love, a ministry with the goal to “enlist, train and equip an Army of Love to help people from all walks of life that are in need of support, prayer, encouragement, healing, direction, and freedom.” Volunteers “enlist” on the ministry’s website and take a discipleship training course before “deploying” to serve others in a variety of ways.

Personal life

Marriages and children

Snyder has been married four times and has four children. Her husbands have been:

 Jeremiah Seawell (2000–2002): Seawell was a local boy from Redding, California, who she began dating at 14 years old. They married shortly after her 18th birthday, in summer 2000, and moved back to her hometown of Glendora. The couple separated within two years and eventually divorced in 2002. 
 Richard Martinez (2004–2011): Snyder began dating former In-N-Out employee Richard Martinez in 2002. They married in 2004 and in November 2006, Snyder gave birth to fraternal twins (one boy, one girl). Snyder filed for divorce in September 2010, and this was finalized in late 2011.
 Val Torres Jr. (2011–2014): In 2010, while separated from Martinez, Snyder began dating Torres, a race car driver. On July 15, 2011, Snyder gave birth to their son. Her divorce from Martinez was finalized later in 2011. Shortly after, she married Torres in a small ceremony. Snyder filed for divorce from Torres in 2013; the marriage officially ended the following year.
 Sean Ellingson (July 7, 2016 – present): In May 2014, Snyder became engaged to Sean Ellingson, a native of La Verne, California. They married on July 7 of that year in Malibu, California. She gave birth to their son, her fourth child, in late 2014. Ellingson is the older brother of actor Evan Ellingson. Lynsi and Sean work together in ministry.

Religion

Snyder is a devout non-denominational Christian, and has spoken several times about her faith. 

According to an interview in Decision magazine, Lynsi said she put her faith in Jesus as a child but drifted away from her faith following the end of her first marriage. She would later say that God used the movie “The Passion of the Christ” to draw back her attention.

In 2015, Lynsi was featured on I Am Second. In it, she spoke about the many deaths within her family and her previous failed marriages and how her faith helped her cope with these misfortunes.

Hobbies

Like her father, Snyder has been an avid drag racing fan and member of the NHRA. She regularly competes in drag racing events, though has been on a break in recent years. In 2015, she was featured on an episode of Jay Leno's Garage, where she showed off a modified '41 Willys that was previously owned by her late father.

Lynsi is founder of the In-N-Out “company band,” .48 Special. She plays bass and sings and her husband Sean Ellingson plays guitar. All the other members of the band are from In-N-Out management, and their rehearsals are built around their work schedules. Lynsi is also an aerialist, fire eater and dancer, regularly performing at .48 Special performances during In-N-Out events. She is also a licensed helicopter pilot.

 Residence 
She moved from the home in 2020 and sold it in 2021.

Snyder has stated that she works primarily out of the Baldwin Park office, home of In-N-Out University and formerly company headquarters, rather than the Irvine corporate headquarters because it is closer to her home.

Privacy and Kidnapping Attempts

Snyder had a long-time penchant for declining nearly all interview requests and rarely appearing at public events. However, in recent years she has become more open to the media, participating in profiles with the Orange County Register, Orange Coast, CBS News, Forbes, Decision Magazine, and Focus on the Family. She regularly attends In-N-Out functions, including store openings, company picnics and leadership training events. 

In her January 2014 interview with Orange Coast'', Snyder said that she has been the target of at least two kidnapping attempts.  In the wake of these attempts, she has deliberately kept herself out of the public eye for the safety of her family, she said. The first purported kidnapping attempt occurred when she was still a high school student in Shingletown; the second took place when she was 21 years old in Baldwin Park, near the local In-N-Out distribution center.

References

Further reading

External links
Slave 2 Nothing Website
Army of Love Website

1982 births
Living people
21st-century American businesspeople
21st-century American businesswomen
American billionaires
American corporate directors
American food industry businesspeople
American people of Canadian descent
American people of Dutch descent
American Protestants
American women business executives
Businesspeople from Los Angeles
California Republicans
Female billionaires
Female dragster drivers
People from Glendora, California
Philanthropists from California
Snyder family